Thadiq is a city in Nejd, Saudi Arabia. It is a historical city established about four centuries ago.  It is located to the north from Riyadh (about 130 km).

See also 

 List of cities and towns in Saudi Arabia
 Regions of Saudi Arabia

Populated places in Riyadh Province